Udinese Calcio bounced back from the hugely disappointing 2001–02 Serie A season, in which it only just managed to avoid relegation. Under new coach Luciano Spalletti, Udinese gathered strength, and was a constant feature on the top half of the league table. Even though the squad lacked the goalscoring punch, the defence led by Néstor Sensini and surprising goalkeeper Morgan De Sanctis held it together to such a degree it finished sixth in the league. Also Czech signing Marek Jankulovski impressed, the Napoli signing switching form left-wing to left back, causing interest from several bigger clubs. In the offence, Udinese's most influential player was David Pizarro, who scored seven times from the midfield and grabbed the attention from Lazio, who tried to sign him and teammate Martin Jørgensen immediately after the season had finished. Undisclosed Lazio players refused moving to Udine as compensation for the transfers, and both stayed on, much to the relief of Spalletti.

Squad

Goalkeepers
  Morgan De Sanctis
  Adriano Bonaiuti
  Olivier Renard

Defenders
  Valerio Bertotto
  Néstor Sensini
  Felipe
  Mirko Pieri
  Marek Jankulovski
  Per Krøldrup
  Mohammed Gargo
  Thomas Manfredini
  Régis Genaux
  Samuel Caballero
  Andrea Sottil

Midfielders
  Giampiero Pinzi
  Sulley Muntari
  David Pizarro
  Alberto
  Giuseppe Gemiti
  Martin Jørgensen
  Fabio Rossitto
  Sergio Almirón

Attackers
  Vincenzo Iaquinta
  Carsten Jancker
  Siyabonga Nomvethe
  Roberto Muzzi
  Thomas Thorninger
  Warley

Serie A

Games

 Udinese-Parma 1–1
 0–1 Adriano (24)
 1–1 Alberto (54)
 Piacenza-Udinese 2–0
 1–0 Dario Hübner (26)
 2–0 Enzo Maresca (88)
 Udinese-Atalanta 1–0
 1–0 Néstor Sensini (60)
 Roma-Udinese 4–1
 1–0 Vincenzo Montella (23)
 1–1 Néstor Sensini (59)
 2–1 Gabriel Batistuta (76)
 3–1 Francesco Totti (81)
 4–1 Francesco Totti (89)
 Udinese-Reggina 1–0
 1–0 David Pizarro (51 pen)
 Juventus-Udinese 1–0
 1–0 Marcelo Salas (49)
 Udinese-Bologna 0–0
 Milan-Udinese 1–0
 1–0 Rivaldo (89)
 Inter-Udinese 1–2
 1–0 Christian Vieri (3)
 1–1 Martin Jørgensen (25)
 1–2 Roberto Muzzi (55)
 Udinese-Chievo 2–1
 1–0 Martin Jørgensen (13)
 2–0 Carsten Jancker (27)
 2–1 Oliver Bierhoff (48)
 Brescia-Udinese 1–1
 0–1 Martin Jørgensen (8)
 1–1 Néstor Sensini (68 og)
 Udinese-Empoli 2–1
 1–0 David Pizarro (16 pen)
 1–1 Ighli Vannucchi (23)
 2–1 Vincenzo Iaquinta (90 + 1 pen)
 Udinese-Torino 1–1
 1–0 Vincenzo Iaquinta (55)
 1–1 Cristiano Lucarelli (58)
 Como-Udinese 0–2
 0–1 Giampiero Pinzi (34)
The match was abandoned due to Como fans rioting against a third penalty for Udinese in the match. Following previous misses by Vincenzo Iaquinta and Roberto Muzzi; David Pizarro was set to take the third one, but the riots ended the match prematurely. Udinese was handed the win 2–0, with Pinzi as the only goalscorer. Como was given a four-match suspension from playing at home.

 Modena-Udinese 0–1
 0–1 Giampiero Pinzi (24)
 Udinese-Perugia 0–0
 Lazio-Udinese 2–1
 1–0 Claudio López (27)
 1–1 Roberto Muzzi (40)
 2–1 Stefano Fiore (45 + 1)
 Udinese-Milan 1–0
 1–0 David Pizarro (37 pen)
 Parma-Udinese 3–2
 1–0 Adriano (11)
 2–0 Simone Barone (56)
 2–1 David Pizarro (57)
 3–1 Hidetoshi Nakata (85)
 3–2 Marek Jankulovski (90 + 2)
 Udinese-Piacenza 2–1
 1–0 Marek Jankulovski (18)
 1–1 Dario Hübner (77)
 2–1 Roberto Muzzi (84)
 Atalanta-Udinese 0–0
 Udinese-Roma 2–1
 1–0 Néstor Sensini (32)
 1–1 Vincenzo Montella (54)
 2–1 Vincenzo Iaquinta (72)
 Reggina-Udinese 3–2
 1–0 Emiliano Bonazzoli (3)
 1–1 David Pizarro (8 pen)
 2–1 David Di Michele (12)
 2–2 Vincenzo Iaquinta (45)
 3–2 Francesco Cozza (65)
 Udinese-Juventus 0–1
 0–1 David Trezeguet (84)
 Bologna-Udinese 1–0
 1–0 Giuseppe Signori (9)
 Udinese-Inter 2–1
 1–0 Roberto Muzzi (48)
 2–0 Vincenzo Iaquinta (59)
 2–1 Iván Córdoba (73)
 Chievo-Udinese 3–0
 1–0 Sasa Bjelanović (10)
 2–0 Federico Cossato (37)
 3–0 Sergio Pellissier (68)
 Udinese-Brescia 0–0
 Udinese-Como 3–2
 1–0 Marek Jankulovski (45)
 1–1 Fabio Pecchia (58)
 1–2 Vedin Musić (62)
 2–2 Giampiero Pinzi (74)
 3–2 Vincenzo Iaquinta (87)
 Empoli-Udinese 1–1
 0–1 Giampiero Pinzi (56)
 1–1 Antonio Di Natale (86)
 Torino-Udinese 0–1
 0–1 Vincenzo Iaquinta (81)
 Udinese-Modena 2–1
 0–1 Diomansy Kamara (40)
 1–1 David Pizarro (43 pen)
 2–1 Roberto Muzzi (62)
 Perugia-Udinese 0–2
 0–1 Marek Jankulovski (60)
 0–2 Martin Jørgensen (87)
 Udinese-Lazio 2–1
 1–0 David Pizarro (67 pen)
 2–0 Marek Jankulovski (83)
 2–1 Claudio López (86 pen)

Sources
  RSSSF – Italy 2002/03

Udinese Calcio seasons
Udinese